On 8 August 2019, Mexican authorities said that they found 19 corpses in Uruapan, Michoacán. Jalisco New Generation Cartel said that they killed the victims, whose bodies were found in three locations in the city.

References 

2019 murders in Mexico 
21st century in Michoacán
21st-century mass murder in Mexico 
August 2019 crimes in North America
August 2019 events in Mexico
Crime in Michoacán
Jalisco New Generation Cartel
Massacres in 2019
Massacres in Mexico
Battles of the Mexican drug war
Violent non-state actor incidents in Mexico
Organized crime events in Mexico
Mass murder in 2019